Maria Nazionale (born July 31, 1969 in Torre Annunziata) is an Italian pop singer and actress.

Career
In  2009 she was nominated to the David di Donatello for Best Supporting Actress thanks to her performance in Gomorra.

In 2013 Nazionale took part in the 63rd edition of the televised Italian song contest Sanremo Music Festival with the song "È colpa mia".

Discography

Albums
 Ha da passà 'a nuttata (1994)
 Dolci ricordi (1995)
 Napoli... ti amo (1996)
 Le classiche di Napoli (1997)
 Storie 'e femmene (1997)
 O core 'e Napule (1998)
 Sentimenti (1999)
 Maria Nazionale le classifiche (2004)
 Scema io te voglio bene (2004)
 Puortame a cammenà (2008)
 Libera (2013)

Filmography

Television
 Sottovoce with Luigi Marzullo – Rai 1
 Maurizio Costanzo Show with Maurizio Costanzo – Canale 5
 Furore with Alessandro Greco – Rai 2
 Speciale Buona Domenica – Canale 5
 Cominciamo bene – Rai 3
 Tappeto Volante – Canale Italia
 In famiglia – Rai 2
 La vita in diretta – Rai 1
 Viva Napoli with Mike Bongiorno – Canale 5

Film
 The King of Laughter (2021)

References

External links
 
 Official website

1969 births
Living people
People from Torre Annunziata
Italian pop singers
21st-century Italian singers
21st-century Italian actresses